Chapar is a town of Upper Dir District in the Khyber Pakhtunkhwa province of Pakistan. It is located at 34°59'35N 72°1'0E with an altitude of 1088 metres (3572 feet).

References

Populated places in Upper Dir District
Tehsils of Upper Dir District